Xanthostemon psidioides is a shrub or tree species in the family Myrtaceae that is endemic to Australia.

It blooms in May producing cream-white coloured flowers.

It is found on and the base of sandstone cliffs in the Kimberley region of Western Australia near the Walcott Inlet and the Prince Regent National Park.

References

psidioides
Rosids of Western Australia
Plants described in 1982
Flora of the Northern Territory